Henry Case (May 1861 – June 7, 1934) was an American golfer. He competed in the men's individual event at the 1904 Summer Olympics.

References

1861 births
1934 deaths
Amateur golfers
American male golfers
Olympic golfers of the United States
Golfers at the 1904 Summer Olympics
Sportspeople from Pennsylvania